Krakovany is a municipality and village in Kolín District in the Central Bohemian Region of the Czech Republic. It has about 900 inhabitants.

Administrative parts
The village of Božec is an administrative part of Krakovany.

References

Villages in Kolín District